Aporhoptrina is a genus of moths in the family Geometridae.

Species
 Aporhoptrina semiorbiculata (Christoph, 1881)

References
 Aporhoptrina at Markku Savela's Lepidoptera and Some Other Life Forms

Ennominae
Geometridae genera